The Royal Norwegian Ministry of Provisioning and Reconstruction was a Norwegian ministry that existed from 1939 to 1950.

It was established on 1 October 1939 as the Ministry of Provisioning, though having no relation to the Ministry of Provisioning which existed from 1916 to 1922.  The name was changed to the Ministry of Provisioning and Reconstruction in 1942. It ceased to exist on 30 June 1950. Its tasks were transferred to various ministries.

From the beginning in 1939 the ministry consisted of four directorates and one department. The directorates were led by Nikolai Schei, Jens Bache-Wiig, Per Prebensen and Øivind Lorentzen. The department was led by Alf Frydenberg with Erling Mossige and Andreas Schei as heads of office.

Ministers

Also, Jens Bache-Wiig was acting minister in 1940, on behalf of the Administrative Council in Oslo. Nikolai Schei and Sverre Støstad were acting ministers in 1945.

References

Provisioning and Reconstruction
1939 establishments in Norway
1950 disestablishments in Norway
Ministries established in 1939